Pseudocentruropsis flavosignata is a species of beetles in the family Cerambycidae, and the only species in the genus Pseudocentruropsis. It was described by Breuning in 1961. The species have elongated body.

References

Desmiphorini
Monotypic Cerambycidae genera